Lea Waters  (born 24 February 1971) is an Australian psychologist, speaker, author and researcher. She is a psychology professor at the University of Melbourne and was the founding director of the Centre for Positive Psychology in the University of Melbourne. In addition, she has affiliate positions at University of Michigan and sits on the Science Board of The University of California and Berkeley’s Greater Good Science Center. Her main areas of research are positive psychology, organisational psychology, education, leadership and parenting.

Waters has published over 110 peer reviewed journals and book chapters. She has been the President of the International Positive Psychology Association and the Chair of the 6th World Congress in Positive Psychology. Waters was awarded Member of the Order of Australia in 2020.

Early life 
Waters received a Bachelor’s Degree with honors in Psychology in 1992 from the University of Melbourne. Waters then received a Ph.D. in Industrial and Organizational Psychology in 1997 from the Deakin University.

Career 
From January 1996, Waters has been a researcher and professor at the University of Melbourne. She has been a psychologist for 25 years and is registered with AHRPA, is a member of the Australian Psychological Society and a member of the College of Organizational Psychologists. In 2005, Waters developed her own consultancy business called 'Visible Wellbeing' working with schools and corporations. She is also a gifted speaker and has been on speaking tours across the globe including speaking at the World Government Summit in Dubai in 2018. Her work has been featured in the Washington Post, the Toronto Globe and The Sydney Morning Herald.

Waters' acclaimed parenting book The Strength Switch was listed in Top Reads by Berkeley University’s Greater Good Science Centre and Top 5 Books UK. It has been translated into Chinese, Japanese, Korean, Taiwanese, Hungarian, Arabic, Spanish, French and Russian.

Waters, working with Martin Seligman and St Peter's College, Adelaide, has been instrumental in the development and implementation of positive education programs throughout Australia. Waters is committed to translating research and working with the media. She has written for the Wall Street Journal, TIME.com Magazine, The Atlantic, and The Guardian. Waters has also appeared on the TEDx Talk. She is the Director of the teacher training program Visible Wellbeing and has developed student e-wellbeing resources for teachers to deliver to students via online and virtual classrooms.

Selected publications

Selected awards 
 2020: Member of the Order of Australia.
 2015: Top 100 Women of Influence in Australia, Westpac Bank and Financial Review.
 2007: Prime Minister’s Award for Best Australian University Teaching Excellence Award.

Personal life 
Waters is married to Matthew Scholes and the couple has two children, Nicholas and Emily.

References 

1971 births
Living people
Academic staff of the University of Melbourne
Deakin University alumni
University of Melbourne alumni
University of Melbourne women
Australian psychologists
Australian women psychologists
Members of the Order of Australia